The Red Tree is the third full-length album by the rock band Moneen. There was also a documentary that chronicled the writing and recording of this album. A music video was released for If Tragedy’s Appealing, Then Disaster’s An Addiction, and it has had some play-time on MuchMusic and FUSE.

Track listing

Additional information

Don't Ever Tell Locke What He Can't Do is a reference to John Locke, a character on the television series Lost.
The East Has Stolen What the West May Want tells the story of two lovers who were separated by the Berlin Wall.
If you rewind it on your CD player for 1:09 seconds there is a short acoustic clip of The Last Song I Will Ever Want to Sing, which vocalist Kenny Bridges recorded by himself and added to the cd without the band's knowledge. The clip is supposed to make the transition between the Red Tree and the band's previous release, Are We Really Happy With Who We Are Right Now?
A limited run of The Red Tree was available on vinyl in early 2007 through the band's website and at shows only. Each copy is numbered, only 300 were available and includes a bonus track not available on the CD version.
The Red Tree was repressed on white and red vinyl for Record Store Day 2012. It featured bonus tracks "His Own Anomaly (39 42' 10" N 044 16' 30" E)" and previously released "Prepare Yourself...The Worst Is Yet To Come". A 7" single was also included, featuring two demos, "Hating Makes Hate OK" and "I'm Afraid Of The Lost Parade". The pressing was limited to 500 copies.

References

Moneen albums
2006 albums
Dine Alone Records albums